The Men's featherweight -57 kg amputee was an event in weightlifting at the 1980 Summer Paralympics, for amputee athletes. Indonesia's R. S. Arlen was the only competitor in the event and only needed to record a valid lift to win the gold. And thus he did, recording a lift of 65 kg to win gold.

Results

See also
 Weightlifting at the 1980 Summer Paralympics

References 

1980 Summer Paralympics events
1980
Para